Hungary competed at the 2013 World Championships in Athletics from August 10 to August 18 in Moscow, Russia.

Medallists

Results

Men
Track and road events

Field events

Women
Track and road events

Field events

Combined events – Heptathlon

References

External links

Nations at the 2013 World Championships in Athletics
World Championships in Athletics
Hungary at the World Championships in Athletics